The 1916 United States presidential election in North Carolina took place on November 7, 1916, as part of the 1916 United States presidential election, which was held throughout all contemporary forty-eight states. Voters chose twelve representatives, or electors to the Electoral College, who voted for president and vice president.

Background
Like all former Confederate states, North Carolina would during its “Redemption” develop a politics based upon Jim Crow laws, disfranchisement of its African-American population and dominance of the Democratic Party. Unlike the Deep South, the Republican Party possessed sufficient historic Unionist white support from the mountains and northwestern Piedmont to gain a stable one-third of the statewide vote total in general elections even after blacks lost the right to vote. Like Virginia, Tennessee and Oklahoma, the relative strength of Republican opposition meant that North Carolina did not have statewide white primaries, although certain counties did use the white primary. Although with disfranchisement of blacks the state introduced a poll tax, it was less severe than any other former Confederate state.

Since the tail end of the 1900s, proposals to reform what was recognised as an inefficient and regressive tax system had become the major issue in North Carolina, especially after the Sixteenth Amendment was ratified.

Vote
Neither candidate campaigned in the state, which had voted Democratic at every election since 1876. At no point was there any serious question of Wilson carrying the state. On election day projections were for a majority for Wilson of between forty-five thousand and fifty thousand, which closely approximated the final result. Nonetheless, North Carolina was one of only three states where Wilson failed to improve upon his 1912 percentage, and indeed his 16.39 point win was three points smaller than conservative Democrat Alton B. Parker managed in 1904. Hughes, in fact, was the first Republican to ever carry Carteret and Clay Counties, suggesting latent opposition to Wilson in the Outer Banks and Appalachia.

Results

Results by county

References 

North Carolina
1916
1916 North Carolina elections